Meshginshahr suspension bridge crosses the Khiav River, near Meshginshahr, Ardabil Province in the northwest Iran. The original bridge was built in 2015. It was designed and installed by Engineer Mahmoud Ganjali-beyk and Engineer Ali Ganjali-beyk.

References

Suspension bridges in Iran
Bridges completed in 2015
Buildings and structures in Ardabil Province
2015 establishments in Iran